Stardumb Records is a small independent record label based in Rotterdam, The Netherlands that was launched in 2000. It is regarded as the best known European label specializing in 1990s-style pop-punk.

History
Stardumb Records started its operation in 2000. Their first release was a 7-inch by local band The Apers, and releases by similar pop punk bands inspired by the
sound of Lookout! Records artists followed. Their roster included Italy's The Manges, and Retarded, and the UK's Zatopeks while they also released records by US bands like The Groovie Ghoulies, The Methadones, The Queers, Geoff Palmer as well as Darlington. Stardumb is the best known European label for this type of music. Their releases have been reviewed by numerous publications.

Notable bands
 The Apers
 Darlington
 The Groovie Ghoulies
 The Manges
 The Methadones
 The Queers
 Geoff Palmer

See also
 List of record labels

External links
 The official Stardumb site
 http://musicbrainz.org/label/01230434-4139-439c-a086-8898a67ef177.html

References

Dutch independent record labels
Punk record labels
Record labels established in 2000